Zibo Vocational Institute nicknamed "Zizhi", is a provincial college offering associate degrees in a wide variety of disciplines. Located in Shandong Province Zibo City Zhoucun District Liantong Road, the school is spread out over three campuses.

School Environment 
Zibo Vocational Institute  is located between Zhangdian District and Zhoucun District. The three campuses are next to each other on Liantong Road.  Extracurricular activities on the campus include tai chi, roller-blading, basketball and breakdancing. Xi Jie, or West Street, divides the North Campus and the West Campus. West Street has a variety of inexpensive restaurants and snack stalls which cater to the student population. Other amenities such as mobile phone stores, hairdressers, internet cafe, post office and bicycle shops are on-campus or nearby.

North Campus 

The North Campus  was established in 2008. The campus is dominated by the main academic building, a trapezoid-shaped multi-story facility. The school cartoon mascot, Huan Huan, meaning "double happy," has a trapezoid—shaped head which echoes the design of the main academic building. The main school library is housed in this building. The North Campus also features a large artificial lake, nicknamed the "Northern Sea."
Schools at the North Campus
Vehicle Engineering
Chemical Engineering 
Mechanical and Electrical Engineering 
Ceramic and Art 
Pharmaceutical and Biotechnology 
Electrical and Electronic Engineering

Café 

In-school cafe bar

Overpass

North Campus and South Campus are connected by a pedestrian overpass.

South Campus 

The South Campus established in 2006, includes the International School where foreign students study Chinese. The grounds of the South Campus are thickly planted with trees. This area is known as the "Little Wood."

Schools at the South Campus
International School
Accounting
Information Engineering
Animation and Art
Arts Design
Culture Communication 
Tourism Management 
Architectural Engineering
International Institute of Business Administration
South Campus contains two dining halls, four convenience stores, one fruit market and several milk-tea bars.
Cosplay show hold annually by The Animation and Art Institute

West Campus 

The West Campus established in 2002, features an artificial lake stocked with ornamental fish and many ornamental cherry trees. A training hospital is located at this campus.
Institutes
Department of Pharmacy
School of Nursing
School of Medical Technology

References

2002 establishments in China
Educational institutions established in 2002
Universities and colleges in Shandong
Vocational education in China
Zibo